Bullis buto, the baby royal, is a species of lycaenid or blue butterfly found in Southeast Asia (Assam, Burma, Thailand, Peninsular Malaya).

See also
List of butterflies of India (Lycaenidae)

References

Iolaini
Fauna of Pakistan